This is a list of 262 species in Gonatocerus, a genus of fairyflies in the family Mymaridae.

Gonatocerus species

 Gonatocerus abbreviatus Ogloblin, 1953 g
 Gonatocerus acanophorae Ogloblin, 1938 g
 Gonatocerus acuminatus (Walker, 1846) c g
 Gonatocerus aegyptiacus Soyka, 1950 c g
 Gonatocerus aequatorianus Ogloblin, 1959 g
 Gonatocerus aethalionis Ogloblin, 1938 g
 Gonatocerus africanus Risbec, 1956 c g
 Gonatocerus americanus Brues, 1907 c g
 Gonatocerus angustiventris Girault, 1915 c g
 Gonatocerus annulicornis (Ogloblin, 1936) c g
 Gonatocerus anomocerus Crawford, 1913 c g
 Gonatocerus anthonomi Girault, 1905 c g
 Gonatocerus antillensis Dozier, 1937 c g
 Gonatocerus appendiculatus Ogloblin, 1939 g
 Gonatocerus arkadak  g
 Gonatocerus ashmeadi Girault, 1915 c g
 Gonatocerus asulcifrons Zeya, 1995 c g
 Gonatocerus ater Forster, 1841 g
 Gonatocerus atriclavus Girault, 1917 c g
 Gonatocerus aureus Girault, 1911 c g
 Gonatocerus australica Girault, 1913 c g
 Gonatocerus ayrensis Girault, 1913 c g
 Gonatocerus baconi Girault, 1912 c g
 Gonatocerus bakrotus Mani & Saraswat, 1973 c g
 Gonatocerus barbos  g
 Gonatocerus bashai Zeya, 1995 c g
 Gonatocerus berezovskiyi Triapitsyn g
 Gonatocerus berijamus Mani & Saraswat, 1973 c g
 Gonatocerus beshbarmak Triapitsyn g
 Gonatocerus bialbifuniculatus Subba Rao, 1989 c g
 Gonatocerus bicolor Girault, 1913 c g
 Gonatocerus bicoloriventris Zeya, 1995 c g
 Gonatocerus bifasciativentris Girault, 1917 c g
 Gonatocerus blefuscu  g
 Gonatocerus blesticus Ogloblin, 1957 g
 Gonatocerus bonaerensis Ogloblin, 1939 g
 Gonatocerus bonariensis Brethes, 1922 g
 Gonatocerus boswelli Girault, 1915 c g
 Gonatocerus bouceki Zeya, 1995 c g
 Gonatocerus brachyurus Ogloblin, 1938 g
 Gonatocerus brevifuniculatus Subba Rao, 1970 c g
 Gonatocerus breviterebratus Subba Rao, 1989 c g
 Gonatocerus brunneus Girault, 1911 c g
 Gonatocerus brunoi Girault, 1912 c g
 Gonatocerus bucculentus Huber, 1988 c g
 Gonatocerus bukashka Triapitsyn g
 Gonatocerus bulgaricus Donev & Triapitsyn g
 Gonatocerus californicus Girault, 1911 c g
 Gonatocerus capitatus Gahan, 1932 c g
 Gonatocerus carahuensis Ogloblin, 1957 g
 Gonatocerus carlylei Girault, 1913 c g
 Gonatocerus caudatus Ogloblin, 1935 c g
 Gonatocerus chrysis (Debauche, 1948) c g
 Gonatocerus chusqueicolus Ogloblin, 1957 g
 Gonatocerus cincticipitis Sahad, 1982 c g
 Gonatocerus cingulatus Perkins, 1905 c g
 Gonatocerus circumvagus Girault, 1915 c g
 Gonatocerus comptei Girault, 1912 c g
 Gonatocerus concinnus Ogloblin, 1936 g
 Gonatocerus conicus (Mathot, 1969) g
 Gonatocerus coxalis Ogloblin, 1959 g
 Gonatocerus crassicornis Viggiani, 1969 g
 Gonatocerus cubensis Dozier, 1932 c g
 Gonatocerus cuscus  g
 Gonatocerus dakhlae Soyka, 1950 c g
 Gonatocerus darwini Girault, 1912 c g
 Gonatocerus davinci Girault, 1912 c g
 Gonatocerus deficiens Ogloblin, 1946 g
 Gonatocerus deleoni Triapitsyn, Logarzo & Virla, 2008 g
 Gonatocerus delhiensis (Narayanan & Subba Rao, 1961) c g
 Gonatocerus devikulamus Mani & Saraswat, 1973 c g
 Gonatocerus devitatakus Mani & Saraswat, 1973 c g
 Gonatocerus dies Girault, 1913 c g
 Gonatocerus dodo Girault, 1920 c g
 Gonatocerus dolichocerus Ashmead, 1887 c g
 Gonatocerus edentulus Zeya, 1995 c g
 Gonatocerus elizabethae Girault, 1925 c g
 Gonatocerus ella Girault, 1931 c g
 Gonatocerus enicmophilus Huber, 1988 c g
 Gonatocerus excisus Ogloblin, 1936 g
 Gonatocerus exiguus Forster, 1861 g
 Gonatocerus fasciativentris Girault, 1913 c g
 Gonatocerus fasciatus Girault, 1911 c g
 Gonatocerus flagellaris Ogloblin, 1959 g
 Gonatocerus flagellatus Huber, 1988 c g
 Gonatocerus flaviventris Dozier, 1932 c g
 Gonatocerus flavocinctus (Walker, 1846) c g
 Gonatocerus flavus Soyka, 1950 c g
 Gonatocerus floridensis Huber, 1988 c g
 Gonatocerus flosculus Girault, 1915 c g
 Gonatocerus fulgor Girault, 1913 c g
 Gonatocerus fulvipodus Subba Rao, 1989 c g
 Gonatocerus fuscicornis (Walker, 1846) c g
 Gonatocerus garchamp  g
 Gonatocerus gerasim  g
 Gonatocerus goethei Girault, 1912 c g
 Gonatocerus gracilicornis Ogloblin, 1936 g
 Gonatocerus grandis Ogloblin, 1936 g
 Gonatocerus granulosus Ogloblin, 1959 g
 Gonatocerus gregi Girault, 1915 c g
 Gonatocerus hackeri Girault, 1938 c g
 Gonatocerus haeckeli Girault, 1912 c g
 Gonatocerus hallami Girault, 1920 c g
 Gonatocerus heinei Girault, 1938 c g
 Gonatocerus helavai Yoshimoto, 1990 c g
 Gonatocerus helmholtzii Girault, 1912 c g
 Gonatocerus hispaniolus  g
 Gonatocerus h-luteum (Ogloblin, 1938) c g
 Gonatocerus huberi Zeya, 1995 c g
 Gonatocerus huxleyi Girault, 1912 c g
 Gonatocerus huyghensi Girault, 1912 c g
 Gonatocerus illinoiensis Girault, 1917 c g
 Gonatocerus impar Huber, 1988 c g
 Gonatocerus inaequalis Debauche, 1949 c g
 Gonatocerus inauditus Ogloblin, 1936 g
 Gonatocerus incomptus Huber, 1988 c g
 Gonatocerus indigenus Girault, 1938 c g
 Gonatocerus inexpectatus Huber, 1988 c g
 Gonatocerus inflatiscapus Huber, 1988 c g
 Gonatocerus io Girault, 1915 c g
 Gonatocerus ipswichia Girault, 1922 c g
 Gonatocerus janzeni Huber g
 Gonatocerus johnstonia Girault, 1917 c g
 Gonatocerus juvator Perkins, 1912 c g
 Gonatocerus kalika Triapitsyn g
 Gonatocerus karakum Triapitsyn g
 Gonatocerus karlik Triapitsyn g
 Gonatocerus katraps Triapitsyn g
 Gonatocerus kazak Triapitsyn g
 Gonatocerus kikimora Triapitsyn g
 Gonatocerus kiskis  g
 Gonatocerus kochi Girault, 1936 c g
 Gonatocerus kodaianus (Mani & Saraswat, 1973) c g
 Gonatocerus koebelei Perkins, 1912 c g
 Gonatocerus komarik Triapitsyn g
 Gonatocerus koziavka Triapitsyn g
 Gonatocerus krasavchik Triapitsyn g
 Gonatocerus kulik Triapitsyn g
 Gonatocerus kum Triapitsyn g
 Gonatocerus kusaka Triapitsyn g
 Gonatocerus lamarcki Girault, 1912 c g
 Gonatocerus latipennis Girault, 1911 c g
 Gonatocerus lissonotus Huber, 1988 c g
 Gonatocerus litoralis (Haliday, 1833) c g
 Gonatocerus logarzoi  g
 Gonatocerus lomonosoffi Girault, 1913 c g
 Gonatocerus longicornis Nees, 1834 c g
 Gonatocerus longicrus Kieffer, 1913 c g
 Gonatocerus longior Soyka, 1946 c g
 Gonatocerus longiterebratus Subba Rao, 1989 c g
 Gonatocerus lucidus Dodd, 1919 c g
 Gonatocerus macauleyi Girault, 1920 c g
 Gonatocerus maculatus Zeya, 1995 c g
 Gonatocerus maculipennis Ashmead, 1900 g
 Gonatocerus maga Girault, 1911 c g
 Gonatocerus malanadensis Subba Rao, 1989 c g
 Gonatocerus mancae Fidalgo & Virla, 1995 g
 Gonatocerus margiscutum Girault, 1914 c g
 Gonatocerus masneri Yoshimoto, 1990 c g
 Gonatocerus mazzinini Girault, 1913 c g
 Gonatocerus mediterraneus Donev & Triapitsyn g
 Gonatocerus megalura (Mathot, 1969) g
 Gonatocerus merces Girault, 1913 c g
 Gonatocerus metanotalis Ogloblin, 1938 g
 Gonatocerus metchnikoffi Girault, 1912 c g
 Gonatocerus mexicanus Perkins, 1912 c g
 Gonatocerus minimus Forster, 1841 g
 Gonatocerus minor Matthews, 1986 c g
 Gonatocerus mirissimus Girault, 1913 c g
 Gonatocerus mirivorus Kurdjumov, 1912 g
 Gonatocerus mitjaevi Triapitsyn & Rakitov g
 Gonatocerus monticolus Zeya, 1995 c g
 Gonatocerus morgani Triapitsyn, 2006 c g
 Gonatocerus morrilli (Howard, 1908) c g
 Gonatocerus mosesi Girault, 1938 c g
 Gonatocerus mumu  g
 Gonatocerus munnarus Mani & Saraswat, 1973 c g
 Gonatocerus musa Girault, 1938 c g
 Gonatocerus narayani (Subba Rao & Kaur, 1959) c g
 Gonatocerus nassaui Girault, 1938 c g
 Gonatocerus nasutus Ogloblin, 1939 g
 Gonatocerus nigriceps Ogloblin, 1955 g
 Gonatocerus nigricornis Girault, 1917 c g
 Gonatocerus nigricorpus Girault, 1917 c g
 Gonatocerus nigriflagellum Girault, 1914 g
 Gonatocerus nigritarsis Ashmead, 1887 c g
 Gonatocerus nigrithorax (Ogloblin, 1953) c g
 Gonatocerus nonsulcatus Girault, 1915 c g
 Gonatocerus notabilis Girault, 1938 c g
 Gonatocerus novickyi Soyka, 1946 c g
 Gonatocerus novifasciatus Girault, 1911 c g
 Gonatocerus nox Girault, 1913 c g
 Gonatocerus nuntius Girault, 1920 c g
 Gonatocerus orientalis Girault, 1917 c g
 Gonatocerus ornatus Gahan, 1918 c g
 Gonatocerus ovicenatus Leonard & Crosby, 1915 c g
 Gonatocerus oxypygus Foerster, 1856 g
 Gonatocerus pachyscapha Girault, 1915 c g
 Gonatocerus pahlgamensis (Narayanan, 1961) c g
 Gonatocerus parcepilosus Ogloblin, 1957 g
 Gonatocerus partifuscipennis Girault, 1916 c g
 Gonatocerus pater Girault, 1920 c g
 Gonatocerus perdix Girault, 1938 c g
 Gonatocerus perforator Ogloblin, 1953 g
 Gonatocerus petrarchi Girault, 1920 c g
 Gonatocerus pictus (Haliday, 1833) c g
 Gonatocerus piriformis Ogloblin, 1955 g
 Gonatocerus poincarei Girault, 1913 c g
 Gonatocerus portoricensis Dozier, 1937 c g
 Gonatocerus pratensis Ogloblin, 1936 g
 Gonatocerus priesneri Soyka, 1950 c g
 Gonatocerus pusilus Ogloblin, 1935 g
 Gonatocerus pygmaeus Girault, 1911 c g
 Gonatocerus quadrivittatus Dozier, 1932 c g
 Gonatocerus quirogai Ogloblin, 1936 g
 Gonatocerus rakitovi  g
 Gonatocerus ramakrishnai (Subba Rao & Kaur, 1959) c g
 Gonatocerus rivalis Girault, 1911 c g b
 Gonatocerus rogersi Matthews, 1986 c g
 Gonatocerus romae Girault, 1928 c g
 Gonatocerus rufescens Ashmead, 1904 g
 Gonatocerus sahadevani (Subba Rao & Kaur, 1959) c g
 Gonatocerus sarawakensis Sveum, 1982 c g
 Gonatocerus saulfrommeri Triapitsyn g
 Gonatocerus schajovskoii Ogloblin, 1957 g
 Gonatocerus seminiger Ogloblin, 1959 g
 Gonatocerus shakespearei Girault, 1915 c g
 Gonatocerus shamimi Subba Rao & Hayat, 1986 c g
 Gonatocerus silhouettae Masi, 1917 c g
 Gonatocerus spectabilis Zeya, 1995 c g
 Gonatocerus spinozai Girault, 1912 c g
 Gonatocerus spiracularis Ogloblin, 1935 g
 Gonatocerus stenopterus Ogloblin, 1936 g
 Gonatocerus sulcatus Girault, 1915 c g
 Gonatocerus sulphuripes (Forster, 1847) g
 Gonatocerus svat Triapitsyn g
 Gonatocerus tamilanus Mani & Saraswat, 1973 c g
 Gonatocerus tarae (Narayanan & Subba Rao, 1961) c g
 Gonatocerus taringae Girault, 1938 c g
 Gonatocerus tenuipennis Girault, 1911 c g
 Gonatocerus terrigena Girault, 1938 c g
 Gonatocerus thyrides (Debauche, 1948) c g
 Gonatocerus tolstoii Girault, 1913 c g
 Gonatocerus trialbifuniculatus Subba Rao, 1989 c g
 Gonatocerus triangulifer Ogloblin, 1959 g
 Gonatocerus tricolor Girault, 1913 c g
 Gonatocerus triguttatus Girault, 1916 c g
 Gonatocerus tuberculifemur (Ogloblin, 1957) c g
 Gonatocerus uat Triapitsyn, 2006 c g
 Gonatocerus ucri Triapitsyn g
 Gonatocerus udakamundus Mani & Saraswat, 1973 c g
 Gonatocerus unicolouratus Subba Rao, 1989 c g
 Gonatocerus urocerus Ogloblin, 1935 c g
 Gonatocerus utahensis Girault, 1917 c g
 Gonatocerus utkalensis Subba Rao, 1989 c g
 Gonatocerus valentinae Ogloblin, 1959 g
 Gonatocerus venustus Zeya, 1995 c g
 Gonatocerus vidanoi (Viggiani & Jesu, 1986) g
 Gonatocerus virlai S.Triapitsyn & Logarzo g
 Gonatocerus walkerjonesi Triapitsyn, 2006 c g
 Gonatocerus woohoo Triapitsyn g
 Gonatocerus yerongae Girault, 1938 c g

Data sources: i = ITIS, c = Catalogue of Life, g = GBIF, b = Bugguide.net

References

Gonatocerus